Irricana  is a town in the Calgary Metropolitan Region of Alberta, Canada.

The name of the town is a contraction of the words "irrigation canals", which are found around the Irricana area.

History 
The name dates the town back to the irrigation projects in the area.  By 1909, the town had a post office, hotel and store operated by the Irricana Trading Company.  Originally incorporated as a village on June 9, 1911, Irricana changed its status to a town 94 years later on June 9, 2005. Irricana celebrated its centennial in 2011.

Demographics 

In the 2016 Census of Population conducted by Statistics Canada, the Town of Irricana recorded a population of 1,216 living in 473 of its 479 total private dwellings, a  change from its 2011 population of 1,162.

See also 
List of communities in Alberta
List of towns in Alberta

References

External links 

1911 establishments in Alberta
Calgary Region
Rocky View County
Towns in Alberta